The Kanosh Tithing Office is a historic building in Kanosh, Utah. It was built in 1870 in Kanosh, Utah as a tithing building for the Church of Jesus Christ of Latter-day Saints, and designed with elements of Greek Revival architectural style. It was acquired by the Daughters of Utah Pioneers in 1952. It has been listed on the National Register of Historic Places since January 25, 1985.

References

Greek Revival architecture in Utah
National Register of Historic Places in Millard County, Utah
Religious buildings and structures completed in 1870
Tithing buildings of the Church of Jesus Christ of Latter-day Saints
1870 establishments in Utah Territory